The Franconia Formation is a geologic formation in the upper mid-western United States, with outcroppings found in Illinois, Indiana, Iowa, Michigan, Minnesota, Missouri, Ohio, and Wisconsin. It preserves fossils dating back to the Cambrian period. It was named the Franconia Formation due to the first published documentation of exposures in vicinity of Franconia, Minnesota in the 1897 Ph.D. dissertation by Charles P. Berkley at the University of Minnesota titled Geology of the St. Croix Dalles. The Franconian stratigraphic stage was named after this formation.

The formation consists of fine-grained dolomitic sandstone with interbedded shaly zones, becoming more dolomitic towards the east and south of its extent.

See also

 List of fossiliferous stratigraphic units in Wisconsin
 Paleontology in Wisconsin

References

 
USGS National Geologic Map Database Unit Summary for "Franconia"
Indiana Geological and Water Survey: Franconia Information at the University of Indiana

Cambrian geology of Wisconsin
Cambrian Minnesota
Cambrian southern paleotropical deposits